James Armand Edmond de Rothschild DCM DL (1 December 1878 – 7 May 1957), sometimes known as Jimmy de Rothschild, was a British Liberal politician and philanthropist, from the wealthy Rothschild international banking dynasty.

Biography
De Rothschild was the son of Edmond James de Rothschild of the French branch of family. He was educated at Lycée Louis-le-Grand in Paris and at Trinity College, Cambridge. He served in the First World War, at the outset as an enlisted man in the French Army then as an officer in The Royal Canadian Dragoons, and ended the war as an officer in the British Army, serving in Palestine as a major in the 39th Battalion, The Royal Fusiliers (part of the "Jewish Legion").  He was awarded the Distinguished Conduct Medal.

He was a keen follower of the turf and a racehorse owner. His 33-1 runner "Bomba" won the Ascot Gold Cup in 1909.

He married Dorothy Mathilde Pinto in 1913. She was 17 years old; he was 35.

He became a naturalised Briton in 1920, and in 1922 he inherited from Alice de Rothschild the Waddesdon Manor estate of his great-uncle Baron Ferdinand de Rothschild, the Liberal Member of Parliament (MP) for Aylesbury from 1885 to 1898.

Politics
Described by the Journal of Liberal History as "one of the Liberal Party's most colourful MPs", Rothschild served as Liberal Member of Parliament for the Isle of Ely constituency from 1929 to 1945.

His defeat by Harry Legge-Bourke in the 1945 general election was one of only a few gains by the Conservative Party that year, with his Liberal colleagues Archibald Sinclair and William Beveridge similarly losing to Tory opponents.

During the Second World War he was Parliamentary Secretary to the Ministry of Supply in the Coalition Government 1940-1945. He was also a deputy lieutenant for the county of London and a justice of the peace in Buckinghamshire.

Philanthropy

Rothschild continued to support his father's Zionist causes, and donated IL6,000,000 towards the construction of the Knesset building in Jerusalem, which was completed in 1966.

When he died in 1957, he bequeathed Waddesdon Manor to the National Trust. His widow Dorothy de Rothschild inherited the surrounding estate, and maintained a strong interest in the house and collections until she died in 1988.

See also
Palestine Jewish Colonization Association

Sources
 Mrs James de Rothschild – Rothschilds at Waddesdon Manor (Collins, 1979)

Notes

External links
 
 Short biography for James de Rothschild Knesset website 
 New York Times obituary for James de Rothschild

1878 births
1957 deaths
Military personnel from Paris
Alumni of Trinity College, Cambridge
James Armand
British Army personnel of World War I
British Jews
British Zionists
British racehorse owners and breeders
Burials at Willesden Jewish Cemetery
Businesspeople from London
Canadian Expeditionary Force officers
French emigrants to England
Jewish British politicians
Jewish Legion
Liberal Party (UK) MPs for English constituencies
Ministers in the Churchill wartime government, 1940–1945
Naturalised citizens of the United Kingdom
Recipients of the Distinguished Conduct Medal
Royal Fusiliers officers
Royal Fusiliers soldiers
UK MPs 1929–1931
UK MPs 1931–1935
UK MPs 1935–1945
Waddesdon Manor